Pedreiras is a civil parish in the municipality of Porto de Mós, Portugal. The population in 2021 was 2,548, in an area of 11.28 km2. It was created on 19 December, 1924 by law No.1:702.

References 

Parishes of Porto de Mós